Olivancillaria is a genus of sea snails, marine gastropod mollusks in the subfamily Olivancillariinae of the family Olividae.

Species
Species within the genus Olivancillaria include:
 Olivancillaria auricularia (Lamarck, 1811)
 Olivancillaria carcellesi Klappenbach, 1965
 †  Olivancillaria claneophila (Duclos, 1840) 
 Olivancillaria contortuplicata (Reeve, 1850)
 Olivancillaria deshayesiana (Ducros de Saint Germain, 1857)
 Olivancillaria orbignyi (Marrat, 1868)
 Olivancillaria teaguei Klappenbach, 1964
 Olivancillaria urceus (Röding, 1798)
 Olivancillaria vesica (Gmelin, 1791)
Species brought into synonymy
 Olivancillaria brasiliana (Lamarck, 1811): synonym of Olivancillaria urceus (Röding, 1798)
 Olivancillaria buckuporum Thomé, 1966: synonym of Olivancillaria carcellesi Klappenbach, 1965
 Olivancillaria brasiliana (Lamarck, 1811): synonym of Olivancillaria urceus (Röding, 1798)
 Olivancillaria millepunctata (Duclos, 1840): synonym of Olivella millepunctata (Duclos, 1835)
 Olivancillaria nana (Lamarck, 1811): synonym of Olivella nana (Lamarck, 1811)
 Olivancillaria steeriae (Reeve, 1850): synonym of Agaronia steeriae (Reeve, 1850)
 Olivancillaria uretai Klappenbach, 1965: synonym of Olivancillaria orbignyi (Marrat, 1868)
 Olivancillaria zenopira (Duclos, 1835): synonym of Olivella nana (Lamarck, 1811)

References

Further reading
 Teso V. & Pastorino G. (2011) A revision of the genus Olivancillaria (Mollusca: Olividae) from the southwestern Atlantic. Zootaxa 2889: 1–34.

External links
 Orbigny, A. D. d'. (1834-1847). Voyage dans l'Amérique méridionale (le Brésil, la république orientale de l'Uruguay, la République argentine, la Patagonie, la république du Chili, la république de Bolivia, la république du Pérou), exécuté pendant les années 1826, 1827, 1828, 1829, 1830, 1831, 1832 et 1833. Tome 5(3) Mollusques. pp. i-xliii, 1-758, 85 plates 

Olividae